Echevarri, Echevarría, Etxebarri(a) or Echávarri may refer to:

 Etxebarri, a town and municipality in Biscay in the Basque Country, Spain
 Etxebarri (Metro Bilbao), a station of the Line 1 and Line 2 of Metro Bilbao
 Etxebarria, a town of Biscay in the Basque Country, Spain
 Etxeberria or Echevarría, a surname of Basque origin

People with the surname
 Angel Echevarria (1971–2020), American baseball player
 Beñat Etxebarria (born 1987), Spanish professional football player
 Carlos Echevarría, Argentine actor on television and in the movies, writer and producer
 David Etxebarria (born 1973), Spanish cyclist
 Eloína Echevarría (born 1961), Cuban long jumper
 Emilio Echevarría (born 1944), Mexican actor
 Fernando Echávarri (born 1972), Spanish yacht racer
 Ignacio Echevarría (born 1960), Spanish literary critic and essayist
 Javier Echevarría Rodríguez (1932–2016), Spanish Roman Catholic prelate
 Juan de Echevarría (1875–1931), Spanish painter
 Juan Miguel Echevarría (born 1998), Cuban long jumper
 Lucía Etxebarría (born 1966), Spanish writer
 Luis E. Echávarri, Spanish engineer
 Lydia Echevarría (born 1931), Puerto Rican actress
 Ofill Echevarria (born 1972), Cuban painter and multimedia artist
 Pedro Echevarria (born 1967), television host and producer with C-SPAN
 René Echevarria, American television writer and producer

See also
Echeverría (disambiguation)
Etcheverry (disambiguation)